The 1988 Scottish League Cup final was played on 23 October 1988 at Hampden Park in Glasgow and was the final of the 43rd Scottish League Cup (Skol Cup). The final was contested by Aberdeen and Rangers and was the second of three consecutive finals between the two clubs.

Rangers won the match 3–2 thanks to goals from Ally McCoist and Ian Ferguson.

Match details

See also
 Aberdeen F.C.–Rangers F.C. rivalry

References

External links
SKOL CUP FINAL &imgt=0 Selection of match images at Alamy

1988
League Cup Final
Scottish League Cup Final 1988
Scottish League Cup Final 1988
20th century in Glasgow